The following is a list of notable events and releases that are expected to happen in 2017 in music in Canada.

Events
 April 2 – Juno Awards of 2017
 April – East Coast Music Awards
 May – Prism Prize
 June – Preliminary longlist for the 2017 Polaris Music Prize is announced
 July – SOCAN Songwriting Prize is won by PUP in the English division and Klô Pelgag in the French division.
 July – Shortlist for the Polaris Music Prize is announced
 September – Lido Pimienta wins the Polaris Music Prize for her album La Papessa
 Fall – 13th Canadian Folk Music Awards
 November 6 – Tower of Song: A Memorial Tribute to Leonard Cohen, a memorial tribute concert to singer-songwriter Leonard Cohen to mark the first anniversary of his death, is held at Montreal's Bell Centre

Bands reunited
Joydrop
Northern Haze
Slow

Albums released

#
2Frères, La Route

A
 Afrikana Soul Sister, Afrikana Soul Sister
 The Age of Electric, The Pretty EP – February 17
 Lydia Ainsworth, Darling of the Afterglow – March 31
 a l l i e, Nightshade
 Alvvays, Antisocialites – September 8
 Ammoye, The Light
 Tafari Anthony, Remember When
 Arcade Fire, Everything Now – July 28
 Austra, Future Politics – January 20

B
 Jason Bajada, Loveshit 2 (Blondie & the Backstabberz)
 Barenaked Ladies, Fake Nudes – November 17
 The Barr Brothers, Queens of the Breakers – October 13 
 The Beaches, Late Show – October 20
 Begonia, Lady in Mind
 Beppie, There's a Song Inside Me
 Bernice, Puff EP
 The Besnard Lakes, Are the Divine Wind – February 3
 Beyries, Landing
 The Birthday Massacre, Under Your Spell – June 9
 Philippe Brach, Le silence des troupeaux
 Broken Social Scene, Hug of Thunder – July 7
 Roxane Bruneau, Dysphorie
 Louise Burns, Young Mopes – February 3
 Spencer Burton, Songs Of
 Matthew Byrne, Horizon Lines

C
 Daniel Caesar, Freudian – August 25
 Steph Cameron, Daybreak Over Jackson Street
 Patricia Cano, Madre Amiga Hermana
 Lou Canon, Suspicious – April 7
 Charlotte Cardin, Main Girl
Celeigh Cardinal, Everything and Nothing at All
 Casper Skulls, Mercy Works
 Keshia Chanté, Unbound 01 – March 24
 Cold Specks, Fool's Paradise
 Corridor, Supermercado
 The Courtneys, The Courtneys II – February 17
 Rose Cousins, Natural Conclusion – February 3
 Crown Lands, Rise Over Run
 Alex Cuba, Lo Unico Constante – April 7
 Eliana Cuevas, Golpes y Flores
 Amelia Curran, Watershed – March 10

D
 Danko Jones, Wild Cat – March 3
 Daphni, Joli Mai
 Desirée Dawson, Wild Heart
 The Dears, Times Infinity Volume Two – July 14
 Death From Above, Outrage! Is Now – September 8
 The Deep Dark Woods, Yarrow
 Mac DeMarco, This Old Dog – May 7
 Le Diable à Cinq, Sorti de l'enfer
 Do Make Say Think, Stubborn Persistent Illusions – May 19
 Julie Doiron, Julie Doiron Canta en Español Vol. 2
 Gord Downie, Introduce Yerself – October 27
 Drake, More Life – March 18
 Durham County Poets, Grimshaw Road
 dvsn, Morning After – October 13

E
 Fred Eaglesmith, Standard
 Earle and Coffin, Wood Wire Blood & Bone (February); A Day in July (September)
 Efajemue, Fragile
 Coral Egan and Karen Young, Dreamers
 Elliott Brood, Ghost Gardens – September 15
 Emily Haines & The Soft Skeleton, Choir of the Mind – September 15
 Quin Etheridge-Pedden, Embark
 André Ethier, Under Grape Leaves

F
 Fast Romantics, American Love – April 28
 Stephen Fearing, Every Soul's a Sailor
 Feist, Pleasure – April 28
 Janina Fialkowska, Chopin Recital 3 – April 7
 FouKi, Extendo
 FouKi, Pré_Zay
 FouKi, Sour Face Musique
 Fucked Up, Year of the Snake
 Nelly Furtado, The Ride – March 31

G
 The Garrys, Surf Manitou
 Ghostkeeper, Sheer Blouse Buffalo Knocks – March 31
 The Glorious Sons, Young Beauties and Fools – October 13
 Godspeed You! Black Emperor, Luciferian Towers – September 22
 Matthew Good, Something Like a Storm – October 20
 Jenn Grant, Paradise – March 3
 Great Lake Swimmers, They Don't Make Them Like That Anymore

H
 Harm & Ease, Wonderful Changes
 Headstones, Little Army – June 2
 Hedley, Cageless – September 29
 Hollerado, Born Yesterday
 Matt Holubowski, Solitudes (Epilogue)
 Nate Husser, Geto Rock for the Youth
 Andrew Hyatt, Iron & Ashes

I
 Iskwé, The Fight Within
 Ivory Hours, Dreamworld

J
 Japandroids, Near to the Wild Heart of Life – January 27
 Julie and the Wrong Guys, Julie and the Wrong Guys – September 8

K
 Kae Sun, Canary – February
 Kid Koala, Music to Draw To: Satellite – January 20
 Brett Kissel, We Were That Song
 Keith Kouna, Bonsoir shérif
 Nicholas Krgovich, In an Open Field
 Pierre Kwenders, Makanda at the End of Space, the Beginning of Time

L
 Land of Talk, Life After Youth – May 19
 Richard Laviolette, Taking the Long Way Home – March 10
 Exco Levi, Narrative – November 24
 Lights, Skin & Earth – September 22
 Loud, Une année record
 Russell Louder, Think of Light
 The Lowest of the Low, Do the Right Now
 Rob Lutes, Walk in the Dark
 The Luyas, Human Voicing – February 24

M
 Maestro Fresh Wes, Coach Fresh – November 17
 Majid Jordan, The Space Between – October 27
 Mama's Broke, Count the Wicked
 Manila Grey, No Saints Under Palm Shade
 Matiu, Matiu
 Matt Mays, Once Upon a Hell of a Time – October 20
Patrice Michaud, Almanach
 Danny Michel, Khlebniknov – January 20
 Millimetrik, Sour Mash
 Mother Mother, No Culture – February 10
 David Myles, Real Love – September 15

N
 The New Pornographers, Whiteout Conditions – April 7
 Nickelback, Feed the Machine – June 9
 Justin Nozuka, High Tide – September 22

O
 Ocie Elliott, Ocie Elliott
 Oh Susanna, A Girl in Teen City
 Our Lady Peace, Somethingness EP, Vol. 1 – August 25
 Ouri, Superficial

P
 Partner, In Search of Lost Time – September 8
 PartyNextDoor, Colours 2 – June 2
 PartyNextDoor, Seven Days – September 28
 Peter Peter, Noir Eden – February 24
 Dany Placard, Full Face
 Joel Plaskett and Bill Plaskett, Solidarity – February 17
 Propagandhi, Victory Lap – September 29

R
 Allan Rayman, Roadhouse 01
 The Real McKenzies, Two Devils Will Talk – March 3
 Alejandra Ribera, This Island – January 27
 Daniel Romano, Modern Pressure
 The Royal Oui, This Is Someday – May 19
 The Rural Alberta Advantage, The Wild
 Ruth B, Safe Heaven – May 5
 Serena Ryder, Utopia

S
 The Sadies, Northern Passages – February 10
 Julien Sagot, Bleu Jane
 Said the Whale, As Long As Your Eyes Are Wide – March 31
 Saukrates, Season 2 – November 17
 Jay Scøtt x Smitty Bacalley, Stockholm 
 Seaway, Vacation – September 15
 Joseph Shabason, Aytche - August 25
 Shauit, Apu Peikussiaku
 Crystal Shawanda, Voodoo Woman
 Vivek Shraya with the Queer Songbook Orchestra, Part Time Woman
 Sister Ray, Untitled
 Silverstein, Dead Reflection – July 14
 Zal Sissokho, Le Palabre
 Sarah Slean, Metaphysics – April 7
 Snotty Nose Rez Kids, Snotty Nose Rez Kids – January; The Average Savage – September
 So Loki, Shine
 Leeroy Stagger, Love Versus – April 7
 Stars, There Is No Love in Fluorescent Light – October 13

T
 Theory of a Deadman, Wake Up Call – October 27
 Timber Timbre, Sincerely, Future Pollution – April 7
 Tire le coyote, Désherbage
 Maylee Todd, Acts of Love – November 3
 Shania Twain, Shania Now
Twin Flames, Signal Fire

V
Rosie Valland, Synchro
Chad VanGaalen, Light Information – September 8
Jennie Vee, Suffer – September 22
Vile Creature, A Pessimistic Doomsayer
Leif Vollebekk, Twin Solitude

W
 Frank Walker, 24
 The Weather Station, The Weather Station - October 6
 Weaves, Wide Open
 Whitehorse, Panther in the Dollhouse – July 7
 Wolf Parade, Cry Cry Cry – October 6
 The Wooden Sky, Swimming in Strange Waters – April 7
 Roy Wood$, Say Less – December 1

Y
 Neil Young, Hitchhiker – September 8
 Neil Young + Promise of the Real, The Visitor – December 1

Year-End List

Deaths

References